He Dequan (born July 31, 1933) is a Chinese engineer specializing in information security. He is an academician of the Chinese Academy of Engineering (CAE) and serves as deputy director of the Advisory Committee for State Informatization (ACSI).

Biography
He was born in Beijing, on July 31, 1933, while his ancestral home in Ningbo, Zhejiang. In 1953 he graduated from Peking University. In the 1980s, he took part in the 863 Program, heading the information security. He once served as director of Beijing Institute of Information Technology Application. On August 21, 2003, he was haired as a part-time professor at Harbin Institute of Technology.

Honours and awards
 November 1994 Member of the Chinese Academy of Engineering (CAE)

References

External links
He Dequan on the Chinese Academy of Engineering  

1933 births
Living people
Engineers from Beijing
Peking University alumni
Members of the Chinese Academy of Engineering